Doll Face is a 1945 American film released by 20th Century Fox and directed by Lewis Seiler starring Vivian Blaine as "Doll Face" Carroll. It also stars actor Dennis O'Keefe and singers Carmen Miranda and Perry Como. The film is based on the 1943 play The Naked Genius written by Gypsy Rose Lee. In the opening credits, she is billed under her birth name, Louise Hovick. The film is also known as Come Back to Me in the United Kingdom.

Synopsis
"Doll Face" Carroll is an entertainer looking to expand her repertoire. After a failed audition, where she is recognized as a burlesque performer from the Gaiety Theatre, her manager and fiancé Mike Hannegan suggests she write an autobiography to project a more literate image and he hires Frederick Manly Gerard as a ghostwriter. Doll Face agrees on the condition she is allowed to dedicate the book to Mike with "For the love of Mike".

Another performer in the burlesque show, Chita Chula, remarks that if the book is a success and Doll Face leaves the show it will probably have to close. Mike then decides to produce a Broadway show of his own with the financial aid of the performers themselves. Frederick offers to put up any money missing. Chita Chula (portrayed by Carmen Miranda) is skeptical she can pull it off, but Mike assures her she'll "probably wind up being another Carmen Miranda!", something Chita Chula perceives as an insult.

Mike leaks word on the book to the press, and riding the publicity, argues the show got all the press it needs and that the book, although all but finished, need not be published. Doll Face, however, decides to go through with it and goes to Jamaica in Queens, NY with Frederick for some final touch-ups. Boat engine trouble on Long Island Sound leaves them marooned on an island and, when Mike finds them, he misreads the situation and breaks up with her. Without "Doll Face" as headliner, the Gaiety Theatre struggles and Mike is forced to finally shut it down.

Doll Face releases her book The Genius DeMilo and when Mike sees she dedicated the book to Frederick instead of him, he regrets leaving her. After Doll Face refuses to talk to Mike, he sends a lawyer to stop her show in the middle of opening night, since she is under contract not to appear in any show not produced by him. She agrees to see him and he asks her forgiveness. After they reunite, she tricks the producer of her show to give Mike a 25% share and co-producer credit so the show can continue.

Cast

Vivian Blaine as Mary Elizabeth (Maybeth) "Doll Face" Carroll
Dennis O'Keefe as Michael Francis "Mike" Hannegan
Perry Como as Nicky Ricci
Carmen Miranda as Chita Chula
Martha Stewart as Frankie Porter
Stephen Dunne as Frederick Manly Gerard (credited as Michael Dunne)
Reed Hadley as Flo Hartman
Stanley Prager as Flo's aide
Charles Tannen as Flo's aide
George E. Stone as stage manager
Frank Orth as Peters
Donald MacBride as Ferguson (lawyer)
Robert Mitchum as passenger (uncredited)

Soundtrack

Vivian Blaine - "Somebody's Walking in My Dream" (Music by Jimmy McHugh, Lyrics by Harold Adamson)
Perry Como and Martha Stewart - "Somebody's Walking in My Dream" (Music by Jimmy McHugh, Lyrics by Harold Adamson)
Perry Como and chorus girls - "Red Hot and Beautiful" (Music by Jimmy McHugh, Lyrics by Harold Adamson)
Vivian Blaine and male quartet - "Red Hot and Beautiful" (Music by Jimmy McHugh, Lyrics by Harold Adamson)
"Eighty Miles Outside of Atlanta"
Perry Como - "Here Comes Heaven Again" (Music by Jimmy McHugh, Lyrics by Harold Adamson)
Perry Como and Vivian Blaine - "Here Comes Heaven Again" (Music by Jimmy McHugh, Lyrics by Harold Adamson)
Perry Como and Martha Stewart - "Dig You Later (A-Hubba Hubba Hubba)" (Music by Jimmy McHugh, Lyrics by Harold Adamson)
Carmen Miranda, Bando da Lua and chorus - "Chico Chico" (Music by Jimmy McHugh, Lyrics by Harold Adamson)
"The Parisian Trot" (Music by Lionel Newman, lyrics by Charles E. Henderson)

Jimmy McHugh and Harold Adamson also submitted the song "True to the Navy", but it did not make it into the film because Paramount refused to license the song.

The song "Dig You Later (A-Hubba Hubba Hubba)" was a celebration of the Bombing of Tokyo (10 March 1945).

Production and filming

The working titles of this film were The Naked Genius and Here's a Kiss. The Motion Picture Production Code did not allow the studio to use The Naked Genius neither as the title of the film nor as title of "Doll Face's" fictional autobiography.

The Production Code Administration also strongly protested the depiction of the lead character as a stripper and several screenplays submitted by the studio were not approved. In late July 1945, Production Code Administration head Joseph I. Breen cautioned studio public relations head Jason S. Joy:

Playwright and renowned stripper Gypsy Rose Lee was credited onscreen using her real name Louise Hovick. The Hollywood Reporter (6 April 1944) wrote that the producer George Jessel had offered Lee a role in the picture, but she did not appear in the film. According to The Hollywood Reporter (June 1944), Carole Landis would star in the film and Jackie Gleason would perform the "comedy lead", and yet another news item (July 1945) reported that William Eythe was scheduled to play the "romantic lead", and that Hazel Dawn had been included in the cast. However, Dawn's appearance in the completed picture has not been confirmed. Dennis O'Keefe was borrowed for the film from Edward Small's company. Doll Face was the screen debuts of Martha Stewart and Lex Barker.

Producer Bryan Foy filled in for director Lewis Seiler for three days while Seiler was ill.

Jimmy McHugh and Harold Adamson submitted the song "True to the Navy" for inclusion in the film and a production number featuring it was filmed at a cost from $60,000 to $75,000. However, McHugh and Adamson previously submitted the song to Paramount which had used it in their 1945 film Bring on the Girls. Paramount refused to license the song for use in Doll Face, and the musical number had to be cut. In a December 1945 letter to Twentieth Century-Fox studio president Spyros Skouras, studio attorney George Wasson speculated that Paramount refused to license the song because Twentieth Century-Fox had obtained the distribution rights to Tales of Manhattan and clearance for the use of the title Sentimental Journey, both of which Paramount also wanted.

According to the legal records, Irving Weissman filed suit against the studio, claiming that the song "Dig You Later (A Hubba-Hubba-Hubba)" was plagiarized from one of his compositions. The case was dismissed in September 1948 by a federal court judge, but Weissman again filed suit through a state court. The disposition of the second suit has not been determined.

Reviews
The studio Twentieth Century-Fox reportedly paid Louise Hovick (Gypsy Rose Lee) a large sum of money for the rights to The Naked Genius. Bosley Crowther of The New York Times wrote that "some one (not Miss Hovick) made a terrible deal...the only distinction in its writing is a persistence in grammatical mistakes. The only remarkability about its pattern is a monotonous fidelity to form." and "Forget the plot, and concentrate on the production numbers performed with gusto by Blaine, Como, and Carmen Miranda."

"A very surprising choice [to be in the cast for the film], I think, is Carmen Miranda for "Doll Face". Not that she isn't one of our best dancers, and certainly one of our most persuasive personalities, but she is so different from Joan Blondell, who created the role on the stage in "Naked Genius" from which "Doll Face" is taken" said Louella Parsons.

The Sydney Morning Herald wrote that "The film has its faults, chiefly technical...Dennis O'Keefe makes a handsome, hard-hitting manager and performs with great sincerity. Perry Como sings in an even more attractive manner than hitherto, and Vivian Blaine is more than adequately attractive, if a trifle too polished, as the "burleycue" blonde. Carmen Miranda appears in a straight part with only one singing number. The innovation is not a success, but the fault is the director's not Carmen's."

DVD release
The film was released on DVD in June 2008 as part of Fox's "The Carmen Miranda Collection."

Parody
In 1985, comedy troop LA Connection used Doll Face as episode 9 of its syndicated show Mad Movies, in which films were re-edited with a dubbed soundtrack. The plot centers around the sleazy "Miss Doll Face Pageant".

Gallery

References

External links

 
 
 

1945 films
1940s romantic musical films
1945 romantic comedy films
20th Century Fox films
American black-and-white films
American films based on plays
Films directed by Lewis Seiler
American romantic comedy films
American romantic musical films
Films scored by David Buttolph
Films scored by Cyril J. Mockridge
1940s English-language films
1940s American films